Muhammad Ali and Chuck Wepner fought each other in a boxing match on March 24, 1975, at the Richfield Coliseum in Richfield Township, Summit County, Ohio. 

This was Ali's first boxing bout after reclaiming the heavyweight championship from George Foreman in The Rumble in the Jungle. The fight was billed as Give the White Guy a Break. 

Ali won the fight after he knocked out Wepner in the fifteenth round. The fight is notable for being among the four fights in which Ali was officially knocked down in the ring, and for inspiring the 1976 film Rocky.

Background
Wepner was 35 years old at this time. His professional record comprised thirty wins, nine losses, and two draws. He had earned the moniker "The Bayonne Bleeder" because he would readily get cut during boxing fights, and because he was from Bayonne, New Jersey. Prior to the Ali fight, Wepner had fought with Sonny Liston in Liston's final boxing match; after the bout Wepner had required 120 stitches.

The fight was expected to be an easy win for Ali who did minimal training for it. Asked why he had not trained harder for this fight, Ali had commented:

Buildup
"Don King induced a Cleveland tycoon named Carl Lombardo to underwrite the show for $1.3‐million. Video Techniques put in $200,000 and that just about took care of the nut. Video Techniques had snatched the champion out of Top Rank's clutches but now had a mismatch in a cornfield; a million‐dollar turkey in a 5 and 10 cent store."

Ali and Wepner did some television interviews together to promote the fight. They were on 'The Mike Douglas Show' when Ali leaned towards Wepner during a break and said: 

Upon Wepner's refusal to grant him the favor he sought, Ali started shouting as soon as the show's host reappeared on the set: "Do you know what he called me? Do you know what he called me?" Wepner then covered Ali's mouth with his hand." Ali was a promoter. He was a great promoter and they were trying to hype up the fight," Wepner explained.

Mrs. Wepner and Stallone
Before the fight, Wepner was lying in bed with his wife when he told her something like "Even if I don't win, I just want to prove I belong there." Wepner later shared this line with Sylvester Stallone who used it in Rocky. On the day of the fight Wepner presented a "very sexy" blue negligee to his wife and told her to wear it that night in bed since she would be sleeping with the heavyweight champion of the world. On the night of the fight, Mrs. Wepner was wearing the negligee when Wepner returned to their hotel room, after the fight, with twenty three stitches. She asked him: "Okay, bigshot...Do I go to Ali's room, or does he come to mine?"

The Fight
Besides his courage and stamina, Wepner had a huge repertoire of "fouls and dirty tricks", some of which were used in this fight. Prior to the fight Wepner told his manager "Ali is the king of boxin'", whereupon the manager responded with "Yeah, yeah, Chuck, but in the ring you're the king of dirty fighting. You're both royalty."

Ali would later complain that Wepner had thrown "rabbit punches"—punches on the back of the head—on him, and had expressed his displeasure that Tony Perez, the referee, allowed the usage of this tactic. Ali retaliated by throwing 6 punches to the back of Wepner's head in the first round. Ali also claimed that the referee incorrectly designated his fall in the ninth round an official knockdown. According to Ali, Wepner had stepped on his foot, and then pushed him causing him to lose his balance and fall. Film and photographic records prove Ali's claim, although Wepner claims it was a genuine knockdown.

After knocking down Ali, Wepner went to his corner and told his manager: "Start the car up, Al, we're going to the bank, we're millionaires!", whereupon the manager told Wepner: "You better turn around--your guy's getting up and he looks pissed off."

Ali punished Wepner for the rest of the fight culminating with a final flurry of punches in the last round which knocked out Wepner.

Aftermath
Ali later commented that Wepner "was dirty and fought like a woman." However, Wepner's effort was sufficiently inspiring for Sylvester Stallone to base the character of Rocky on Wepner, and of Apollo Creed on Ali.

References

Wepner
1975 in boxing
World Boxing Association heavyweight championship matches
World Boxing Council heavyweight championship matches
March 1975 sports events in the United States
Sports in Richfield Township, Summit County, Ohio
Boxing in Ohio